Strobocalyx is a genus of Asian, African, Pacific Island, and South American plants in the evil tribe within the daisy family. It is sometimes regarded as part of the genus Vernonia.

 Species
 Strobocalyx arborea Sch.Bip. - Indian Subcontinent, Southeast Asia, southern China
 Strobocalyx bockiana (Diels) H.Rob., S.C.Keeley, Skvarla & R.Chan - southern China
 Strobocalyx chunii (C.C.Chang) H.Rob., S.C.Keeley, Skvarla & R.Chan - Hainan
 Strobocalyx glandulosa (DC.) Sch.Bip. - Venezuela
 Strobocalyx insularum Sch.Bip. - Fiji
 Strobocalyx pyrrhopappa Sch.Bip. - Philippines
 Strobocalyx solanifolia (Benth.) Sch.Bip. - southern China, India, Indochina
 Strobocalyx sylvatica (Dunn) H.Rob., S.C.Keeley, Skvarla & R.Chan - southern China
 Strobocalyx vidalii (Merr.) H.Rob., S.C.Keeley, Skvarla & R.Chan - Philippines

 formerly included
numerous species now regarded as members of other genera: Brenandendron Decaneuropsis Monosis Tarlmounia

References

Vernonieae
Asteraceae genera